Pilodeudorix catalla is a butterfly in the family Lycaenidae. It is found from Ghana to Cameroon and in Equatorial Guinea and the Democratic Republic of the Congo (Uele).

References

Butterflies described in 1895
Deudorigini
Butterflies of Africa